The Last Innocent White Man in America is a 1993 non-fiction book by the American liberal writer John Leonard.

Overview
A collection of author John Leonard's essays and writings.

See also
 White guilt

References

1993 non-fiction books
Political books
American non-fiction books
Books about race and ethnicity
English-language books
Essay collections
Works about White Americans